Bus attacks are a crime in which passengers and/or drivers of a bus are targeted, oftentimes in an act of terrorism. The high frequency of bus attacks are attributed to the ease of the attackers' access to a large group of unprotected people within an enclosed space. As such, it is one of the most common methods of public transportation being targeted or used as weapons, with a high potential for mass-casualties. Bus attacks occur most commonly in regions such as South Asia, Middle East and North Africa, including countries such as Pakistan and Israel.

Afghanistan 

 Kabul bombings (2021)

Azerbaijan 

 Tbilisi–Agdam bus bombing (1990)

China 

 Ürümqi bus bombings (1997)

Germany 

 Borussia Dortmund team bus bombing (2017)

India 

 Mumbai bus bombing (2002)

Israel 

 Ma'ale Akrabim massacre (1954)
 Avivim school bus bombing (1970)
 Coastal Road massacre (1978)
 Afula bus suicide bombing (6 April 1994)
 Hadera bus station suicide bombing (13 April 1994)
 Dizengoff Street bus bombing (October 1994)
 Ramat Gan bus bombing (July 1995)
 Ramat Eshkol bus bombing (August 1995)
 Jaffa Road bus bombings (1996)
 Camp 80 junction bus 823 attack (November 2001)
 Haifa bus 16 suicide bombing (December 2001)
 Umm al-Fahm bus bombing (March 2002)
 Patt Junction Bus bombing (June 2002)
 Allenby Street bus bombing (September 2002)
 Kiryat Menachem bus bombing (November 2002)
 Tel Aviv Central bus station massacre (January 2003)
 French Hill suicide bombings (May 2003)
 Haifa bus 37 suicide bombing (March 2003)
 Davidka Square bus bombing (June 2003)
 Shmuel HaNavi bus bombing (August 2003)
 Gaza Street bus bombing (January 2004)
 Liberty Bell Park bus bombing (February 2004)
 Beersheba bus bombings (August 2004)
 Jerusalem bus stop bombing (2011)
 Tel Aviv bus bombing (2012)
 Bat Yam bus bombing (2013)
 Jerusalem bus bombing (2016)

Kenya 

 Nairobi bus bombing (1975)
 Nairobi bus bombings (2014)

Lebanon 

 Beirut bus massacre (1975)

Pakistan 

 Bhai Pheru bus bombing (1996)
 Karachi bus bombing (2002)
Peshawar bus bombing (2016)

The Philippines 

 Bukidnon bus bombing (2014)

Russia 

 Krasnodar bus bombing (1971)
 Volgograd bus bombing (2013)

Serbia 

 Lužane bus bombing (1999)
 Podujevo bus bombing (2001)

Sri Lanka 

 Colombo central bus station bombing (1987)
Madhu school bus bombing (January 2008)
 Piliyandala bus bombing (April 2008)
 Moratuwa bus bombing (June 2008)

Tunisia 

 Tunis bombing (2015)

United Kingdom 
 Ballygawley bus bombing (1988)
 1990 Wembley bombing (1990)
 Aldwych bus bombing (1996)
 Tavistock Square bus bombing (2005)

Yemen 

 Sadah bus bombing (2018)

References

bus attacks